Staraya Vasilyevka (İske Väseli; , İśke Vasilyevka) is a rural locality (a selo) in Mendyanovsky Selsoviet, Alsheyevsky District, Bashkortostan, Russia. The population was 266 as of 2010. There are 5 streets.

Geography 
Staraya Vasilyevka is located 33 km southwest of Rayevsky (the district's administrative centre) by road. Mendyanovo is the nearest rural locality.

References 

Rural localities in Alsheyevsky District